Lieutenant General Sir John Colquhoun Grant  (177220 December 1835) was a British soldier.

Military career
Sir Colquhoun Grant joined the 36th Foot as an ensign in 1793, exchanging (some years later) to the cavalry (25th Light Dragoons), with which he served at Seringapatam, but returning to the infantry in 1802 to command the 72nd Foot, which he led for six years. In 1806, at the head of his regiment he joined Sir David Baird's expedition to the Cape of Good Hope and on 8January was wounded in action against the Batavian army at the Battle of Blaauwberg. On announcing the victory of the British in despatches Baird remarked: "Your lordship will perceive the name of Lt.-Col. Grant among the wounded ; but the heroic spirit of this officer was not subdued by his misfortune, and he continued to lead his men to glory as long as an enemy was opposed to the 72nd Regt."

He exchanged to the 15th Hussars in 1808, and took part in Sir John Moore's expedition to the Peninsular, being wounded at Sahagún fighting the French. He returned to Spain in January 1813, in command of a cavalry brigade, which saw action at the Battle of Morales. He continued to serve in this capacity, with one interruption, until the end of the Peninsular campaign. Wellington was less than impressed with the performance of Grant's hussar brigade at the Battle of Vitoria and Grant was eventually replaced in command. However, Grant's political influence meant that he soon returned to the Peninsular to take over command of the light dragoon brigade of Robert Ballard Long. He was appointed KCB in 1814. At Waterloo, Grant commanded the 5th Cavalry Brigade, consisting of the 7th and 15th Hussars with the 13th Light Dragoons attached, which was stationed in the centre of the allied position; during the battle he had five horses shot under him. Grant was promoted to lieutenant-general in 1830, and he served as a Tory Member of Parliament (MP) for the rotten borough of Queenborough from 1831 until the borough was disenfranchised under the Reform Act 1832.

Grant was a groom of the bedchamber to Prince Ernest Augustus, Duke of Cumberland, later King of Hanover. He was reputed to have been the strongest man in the British Army, and was given the nickname "The Black Giant." He was appointed colonel of the 12th (The Prince of Wales's) Royal Regiment of (Light) Dragoons (Lancers) in 1825. He transferred to the 15th (The King's) Regiment of (Light) Dragoons (Hussars) in 1827, succeeding the Duke of Cumberland, a post he held until his death.

Personal life
Grant died in 1835. He had married Marcia, daughter of the Reverend J. Richards, of Long Bredy, Dorset. Their only surviving child, Marcia, eloped with Whig politician Richard Brinsley Sheridan in May 1835.

Notes

References

Bibliography

External links 
 

1764 births
1835 deaths
British Army personnel of the Napoleonic Wars
Tory MPs (pre-1834)
Members of the Parliament of the United Kingdom for Queenborough
UK MPs 1831–1832
Knights Commander of the Order of the Bath
Recipients of the Waterloo Medal
Recipients of the Order of St. Vladimir, 3rd class
Knights Third Class of the Military Order of William
12th Royal Lancers officers
15th The King's Hussars officers